The Voice of the Desert is the rock music band from the Diocese of Alcala de Henares, Madrid Spain. Three of the members of this band are catholic priests. They are known as rocker priests and have published six albums with contemporary christian music.

Biography

The musical group was born in 2003 in the diocesan seminary of Alcala de Henares, Spain, when some students of theology came together to sing and record some songs about of God. Their live performances have given them a great credibility and have provided them with million followers in Spain, Portugal and the United States.

In 2011, Pope Benedict XVI visited Madrid on the occasion of World Youth Day and The Voice of the Desert gave several concerts in the Spanish capital for young people from dozens of countries on the five continents. Since 2015 they cross the Atlantic Ocean to take their music to the United States of the hand of the Ministerio Mensaje Texas.

In March 2016 they published Mi Fortaleza, a compilation CD with the 16 essential songs of La Voz del Desierto. The album was distributed by Universal Music. In March 2017, his sixth album was released, entitled Tu rostró buscaré, produced by Santi Fernández, drummer of Los Secretos. 

In January 2019 they released the video clip for their song Magnificat and in Panama City they gave eight concerts in just nine days. In 2020, due to the coronavirus pandemic, they gave online concerts and celebrated the Eucharist, prayed the rosary and made the exposition of the Blessed Sacrament through social networks.

Members

 Daniel Gomez de la Vega (Dani): voice.
 Jesus Javier Mora (Curry): voice.
 Julio Alejandre: bass guitar.
 Jose Cortes: percussion.
 Alejandro de Dios (Alex): guitar.
 Alberto Raposo (Rapo): guitar.
 Pedro Martinez: piano.
 Ignacio Ortiz (Nacho): guitar.

Discography 
 Thy Will Be Done On Me – 2005
 To A Light – 2007
 The Calling – 2010
 The Lord Gets Me Up Again – 2013
 My Strength – 2016
 I will seek Your face – 2017

References

External links 
 
 Salt and Light - The Spanish Rocker Priests
 The Catholic Universe

Catholic media
Spanish musical groups
Contemporary Christian music